Piispajärvi is a medium-sized lake in the Oulujoki main catchment area in Kainuu region, in Finland. There is also a village named Piispajärvi in the eastern shore of the lake. The Finnish National Road 5 cross the lake near the village.

See also
List of lakes in Finland

References

Lakes of Suomussalmi